Trolls is an American animated media franchise created by DreamWorks Animation, inspired by the successful line of Troll doll toys created by Thomas Dam. The franchise consists of two feature films, Trolls, released in 2016, and Trolls World Tour released in 2020, two holiday television specials: Trolls Holiday and Trolls: Holiday in Harmony and two animated series: Trolls: The Beat Goes On! on Netflix, and Trolls: TrollsTopia on Hulu and Peacock.

Films

Trolls (2016) 

Trolls is a 2016 American computer-animated musical comedy film based on the Troll dolls created by Thomas Dam. Mike Mitchell directed the film, with Jonathan Aibel and Glenn Berger serving as the writers. The film is based on a story by Erica Rivinoja. The film features the voices of Anna Kendrick, Justin Timberlake, Christopher Mintz-Plasse, Zooey Deschanel, Christine Baranski, Russell Brand, James Corden, Ron Funches, Jeffrey Tambor, John Cleese and Gwen Stefani. The film follows two trolls who go on a quest to save their village from destruction by the Bergens, creatures who eat Trolls to be happy.

DreamWorks announced plans for a film based on the Troll toyline as early as 2010. This version was to be written by Adam Wilson and Melanie Wilson LaBracio. By 2012, Chloë Grace Moretz had already been cast in the female lead role and Jason Schwartzman was reported to have been offered the male lead. In September 2012, 20th Century Fox and DreamWorks Animation announced that the film with the working title Trolls would be released on June 5, 2015, with Anand Tucker set to direct the film, written by Wallace Wolodarsky and Maya Forbes.

By April 2013, DreamWorks Animation had acquired the intellectual property for the Trolls franchise from the Dam Family and Dam Things. Having "big plans for the franchise," DreamWorks Animation became the exclusive worldwide licensor of the merchandise rights, except for Scandinavia, where Dam Things remains the licensor. In May 2013, the film was pushed back for a year to November 4, 2016. The same month, DreamWorks Animation announced that Mike Mitchell and Erica Rivinoja has been hired as a director and screenplay writer to "reimagine" the film as a musical comedy, which would present the origin of the Trolls' colorful hair. On June 16, 2014, Anna Kendrick joined the cast to voice Poppy, a princess. On September 15, 2015, Deadline Hollywood reported that Justin Timberlake would voice a character named Branch. Timberlake previously worked with DreamWorks Animation as the voice of Arthur "Artie" Pendragon in Shrek the Third in 2007. The full cast announced their respective roles via announcements on Twitter on January 6, 2016.

Trolls premiered on October 8, 2016, at the BFI London Film Festival and was theatrically released in the United States on November 4 by 20th Century Fox and received mostly positive reviews from critics and grossed $346 million worldwide against its $125 million budget. The film received an Academy Award nomination for Best Original Song for "Can't Stop the Feeling!".

Trolls World Tour (2020) 

Trolls World Tour is a 2020 American computer-animated jukebox musical comedy film produced by DreamWorks Animation and distributed by Universal Pictures. The film is directed by Walt Dohrn, produced by Gina Shay, and written by Jonathan Aibel, Glenn Berger, Elizabeth Tippet, Maya Forbes and Wallace Wolodarsky, from a story by Aibel and Berger. The film stars the voices of Anna Kendrick, Justin Timberlake, Rachel Bloom, James Corden, Ron Funches, Kelly Clarkson, Anderson .Paak, Sam Rockwell, George Clinton and Mary J. Blige.

On February 28, 2017, Universal Pictures and DreamWorks Animation announced a sequel to the 2016 film Trolls, with Anna Kendrick and Justin Timberlake reprising their roles as Poppy and Branch.

In March 2017, podcasters the McElroy brothers began campaigning for roles in the film via a podcast titled "The McElroy Brothers Will Be in Trolls 2". Following the campaign's success, DreamWorks confirmed in September 2018 that the McElroy brothers would make cameo appearances in World Tour.

Sam Rockwell, Chance the Rapper, Anthony Ramos, Jamie Dornan and Flula Borg were added to the cast in May 2018. Corden, Icona Pop, Funches, and Nayyar returned to reprise their roles. On June 12, 2018, the film was retitled as Trolls World Tour. In October 2018, it was confirmed that Kelly Clarkson had joined the cast, and will perform an original song. In June 2019, along with promotional posters, new cast members have been announced, which include: J Balvin, Mary J. Blige, Rachel Bloom, George Clinton, Kenan Thompson, Ester Dean, Anderson .Paak and Gustavo Dudamel.

Universal Pictures originally planned to release Trolls World Tour theatrically in the United States on April 10, 2020. It was later pushed back to April 17, 2020. Following the delay of No Time to Die, it was once again pushed up to the original April 10 release date. On March 17, Universal announced that the film would be released simultaneously in theaters and through Premium Video on Demand on April 10 in the United States and Canada due to the COVID-19 pandemic. As the pandemic receded, the film was released back in regular theatres.

Trolls 3 (2023)
On April 9, 2020, Justin Timberlake expressed interest in participating in the future Trolls films during his Apple Music takeover, "I hope we make, like, seven Trolls movies, because it literally is the gift that keeps on giving". On November 22, 2021, it was announced that a third Trolls film would be released in theaters on November 17, 2023.

Short films

Travel Through Troll Village (2017)
Travel Through Troll Village is a short film included on the home media releases of Trolls. In it, Cloud Guy provides the viewer with a tour of Troll Village while giving insights to its many residents.

Dress Up (2017)
A promotional short for Trolls Holiday, Dress Up follows Biggie playing dress-up with Mr. Dinkles only for Poppy to walk in on their playtime.

Together (2017)
A promotional short for Trolls Holiday, Together features Satin and Chenile managing being stuck together while having different thoughts on what to do next.

Trolla-Palooza Tour (2017)
A promotional short for Trolls Holiday,  Trolla-Palooza Tour focuses on Branch as he copes with the idea that his musical talent  isn't being noticed while playing on Tour with his friends.

Tiny Diamond Goes Back To School (2020)
Tiny Diamond Goes Back To School is a traditionally-animated short film included on the home media releases of Trolls World Tour. Taking place after the events of the film, the short follows Guy Diamond's son, Tiny Diamond as he struggles to find the perfect outfit for his new School year.

Television specials

Trolls Holiday (2017) 

Trolls Holiday is a Christmas special that premiered on NBC. The half-hour Christmas special was directed by Joel Crawford and produced by DreamWorks Animation. The main cast all reprised their roles, as their respective characters, most notably Anna Kendrick, Justin Timberlake, Zooey Deschanel, and Icona Pop as Poppy, Branch, Bridget, and Satin (Aino Jawo) & Chenille (Caroline Hjelt), respectively.

The special premiered on November 24, 2017 (Black Friday). The premiere of Trolls Holiday attracted 5.36 million viewers, with a 1.5 in the 18-49 demographic. It is the second most watched program of the night, behind How the Grinch Stole Christmas!, with 5.78 million viewers.

Trolls: Holiday in Harmony (2021) 

Trolls: Holiday in Harmony is the second Christmas special that premiered on NBC. The half-hour Christmas special was written and directed by Sean Charmatz and Tim Heitz and produced by DreamWorks Animation.

The special premiered on November 26, 2021.

Television series

Trolls: The Beat Goes On! 

Trolls: The Beat Goes On! is an American animated web television series based on the film Trolls. The series was released on Netflix on January 19, 2018 exclusively in the United States, Canada, Latin America, United Kingdom, Ireland, Australia, New Zealand, the Nordics, Benelux, and France.

Amanda Leighton, Skylar Astin, Kari Wahlgren, Sam Lerner, David Kaye, David Fynn, Sean T. Krishnan, Kevin Michael Richardson, and Fryda Wolff provide the new voices for Princess Poppy, Branch, Bridget, King Gristle, King Peppy, Biggie and Mr. Dinkles, Guy Diamond, Smidge, DJ Suki and Satin & Chenille for this series respectively, with Ron Funches, and Walt Dohrn reprising their roles of Cooper, and Cloud Guy from the films, respectively.

Shortly after the release of the first season, it was confirmed that there would be a second season, which was released on March 9 and consists of seven episodes. The third season was released on August 24, 2018, the fourth season on November 2, 2018, the fifth season on January 18, 2019, the sixth season on April 9, 2019, the seventh season on August 27, 2019, and the eighth and final season was released on November 22, 2019.

Trolls: TrollsTopia 

On January 17, 2020, DreamWorks announced a new Trolls TV series, titled Trolls: TrollsTopia, to be distributed exclusively on both Hulu and Peacock. The series was originally scheduled to be released in late 2020.

Due to the effects of COVID-19 on Peacock's original release schedule, many of the planned originals, including this series, have been delayed. Hulu had not announced any delays and would release the series on schedule. The release date for the series on Hulu was confirmed to be November 19, 2020. The series was released on Hulu and Peacock on November 19, 2020. Following the events of Trolls World Tour, the show focuses on Poppy building TrollsTopia, a community where all the Trolls tribes can live together. It features the cast of the previous series reprising their roles, with Kenan Thompson, Ron Funches, and Walt Dohrn reprising their roles of Tiny Diamond, Cooper, and Cloud Guy from the films, respectively.

A first season was released on November 19, 2020. A second season was released on March 18, 2021. A third season was released on June 10, 2021. A fourth season was released on September 2, 2021. A fifth season was released on December 9, 2021. A sixth season was released on February 17, 2022. A seventh and final season was released on August 11, 2022.

Recurring cast and characters

Crew

Additional Crew

Reception

Box office performance

Critical response

References 

Trolls
Universal Pictures franchises
Universal Pictures
American film series
Film franchises
Film series introduced in 2016
DreamWorks Animation franchises
Computer-animated films